Kevin Stewart MacLeod  (born 1951) is a former Canadian Secretary to the Queen of Canada, former Usher of the Black Rod for the Canadian Senate, and the author of the historical fiction novel, A Stone on Their Cairn / Clach air An Càrn.

Born in North Sydney, Nova Scotia, MacLeod studied at Boston University and Carleton University, where he received both his bachelor's degree in history and political science and a master's degree in international affairs, before moving on to the University of Burgundy in Dijon, France. After his return from there, MacLeod served for 10 years as an administrative assistant in the House of Commons of Canada, subsequently acting as a chief of staff for one of the then ministers of the Crown before being employed by the Department of Canadian Heritage for 22 years. Among his accomplishments in that office, MacLeod was appointed as the Chief of Protocol and then authored A Crown of Maples / La Couronne canadiennean educational book on the Canadian monarchy, published by the heritage department.

It is the responsibility of the Department of Canadian Heritage to organize royal tours of Canada, and it was for that in 1987 of Queen Elizabeth II that MacLeod first had a part in coordinating such an event. By the time of the Queen's 2005 visit to the prairies to celebrate the centennials of Alberta's and Saskatchewan's entry into Confederation, MacLeod was given the role of Acting Secretary to the Queen. For his service to the monarch, he had already been in 1992 appointed as a member of the Royal Victorian Order, and in 2002, the year of Elizabeth's Golden Jubilee, was promoted to the rank of lieutenant. But it was during the 2005 tour that MacLeod was elevated by the Queen in person to the highest position a Canadian can hold in the order (due to the government's adherence to the Nickle Resolution), that of commander; this made MacLeod the only Canadian to be promoted through all three levels of the order in Canada.

On March 27, 2008, MacLeod was appointed by order of the Governor-in-Council as the Usher of the Black Rod for the Senate, replacing Terrance Christopher.

On April 1, 2009, MacLeod was further appointed as the full-time Canadian Secretary to the Queen, putting him in charge of, amongst other things, coordinating royal tours of Canada and chairing the Diamond Jubilee Committee (to organize the celebrations in 2012 for the 60th anniversary of Queen Elizabeth II's accession as Queen of Canada). He was responsible for the visit of Prince Charles and the Duchess of Cornwall to Canada in November 2009, and he was responsible for co-ordinating the Queen's 24th official visit to Canada in 2010.

In 2010, MacLeod was appointed by the Prime Minister to the Governor General Consultation Committee, a special committee to recommend a successor to Governor General of Canada Michaëlle Jean. The panel recommended David Lloyd Johnston, who was installed as viceroy on October 1, 2010.

MacLeod retired from his post as the Usher in 2013. MacLeod retired from his post as Canadian Secretary to the Queen, and from the public service, on February 10, 2017.

Medal entitlement
Kevin S. MacLeod is entitled to the following medals.

References

External links
 Personal website of Kevin MacLeod
 

1951 births
Living people
Canadian civil servants
Carleton University alumni
People from North Sydney, Nova Scotia
Canadian people of Scottish descent
Canadian Commanders of the Royal Victorian Order